Rashed Jalal (Arabic:راشد جلال) (born 8 December 1994) is an Emirati footballer plays for Gulf Heroes as a midfielder.

References

External links
 

Emirati footballers
1994 births
Living people
Al-Nasr SC (Dubai) players
Fujairah FC players
Hatta Club players
Al-Arabi SC (UAE) players
Gulf Heroes FC players
UAE Pro League players
UAE First Division League players
Association football midfielders